Events from the year 1972 in the United States.

Incumbents

Federal government 
 President: Richard Nixon (R-California)
 Vice President: Spiro Agnew (R-Maryland)
 Chief Justice: Warren E. Burger (Minnesota)
 Speaker of the House of Representatives: Carl Albert (D-Oklahoma)
 Senate Majority Leader: Mike Mansfield (D-Montana)
 Congress: 92nd

Events

January
 January 2 – Pierre Hotel Robbery: Six men rob the safety deposit boxes of The Pierre Hotel in New York City of at least $4 million.
 January 5 – U.S. President Richard Nixon orders the development of a Space Shuttle program.
 January 7 – Howard Hughes speaks to the press by telephone to denounce Clifford Irving's hoax biography of him.
 January 16 – Super Bowl VI: The Dallas Cowboys defeat the Miami Dolphins 24–3.
 January 24 – Japanese soldier Shoichi Yokoi is discovered in Guam; he had spent 28 years in the jungle and becomes the third-to-last Japanese soldier to surrender after World War II.
 January 25 – Shirley Chisholm, the first African American Congresswoman, announces her candidacy for President.
 January 27 – Two New York City Police Department officers, Gregory Foster and Rocco Laurie, are assassinated by members of the Black Liberation Army (BLA) while on foot patrol in New York's East Village area.

February
 February 2 – The last draft lottery is held, a watershed event in the wind-down of military conscription in the United States during the Vietnam era. These draft candidates are never called to duty.
 February 4 – Mariner 9 sends pictures from Mars.
 February 5 – Bob Douglas becomes the first African American elected to the Basketball Hall of Fame.
 February 15 – Phonorecords are granted U.S. federal copyright protection for the first time.
 February 18 – The California Supreme Court voids the state's death penalty, commuting all death sentences to life in prison.
 February 21–28 – U.S. President Richard Nixon makes an unprecedented 8-day visit to the People's Republic of China and meets with Mao Zedong.
 February 23 – Activist Angela Davis is released from jail. A Caruthers, California, farmer, Rodger McAfee, helps her make bail.
 February 24 – North Vietnamese negotiators walk out of the Paris Peace Talks to protest U.S. air raids.
 February 26 – A coal sludge spill kills 125 people in Buffalo Creek, West Virginia.

March
 March 2 – The Pioneer 10 spacecraft is launched from Cape Kennedy, to be the first man-made satellite to leave the solar system.
 March 3 
 Sculpted figures of Jefferson Davis, Robert E. Lee, and Stonewall Jackson are completed at Stone Mountain in the U.S. state of Georgia.
 Mohawk Airlines Flight 405 crashes into a house on Edgewood Avenue in Albany, New York, killing 16 of the 47 people on board, and one person in an upstairs apartment. The impact happened at 8:48 pm after the commuter plane lost power during a snowstorm.
 March 13 – Clifford Irving admits to a New York court that he had fabricated Howard Hughes' "autobiography".
 March 15 – The Godfather has its premiere at the Loew's State Theatre in New York City.
 March 16 – The first building of the Pruitt–Igoe housing development in St. Louis is destroyed.
 March 22 – The 92nd U.S. Congress votes to send the proposed Equal Rights Amendment to the states for ratification.
 March 24 – Gilchrest Road, New York crossing accident: A school bus crashes into a train in Congers, New York, killing five students. 
 March 26 – [After 14 years, the last of Leonard Bernstein's Young People's Concerts is telecast by CBS. This last concert is devoted to Gustav Holst's The Planets.

April
 April 7 – Vietnam War veteran Richard McCoy Jr. hijacks a United Airlines jet and extorts $500,000; he is later captured.
 April 10
The U.S. and the Soviet Union join some 70 nations in signing the Biological Weapons Convention, an agreement to ban biological warfare.
The 44th Annual Academy Awards, hosted by Helen Hayes, Alan King, Sammy Davis Jr. and Jack Lemmon, is held at Dorothy Chandler Pavilion in Los Angeles. William Friedkin's The French Connection wins five awards, including Best Picture and Best Director for Friedkin. The film is also tied with both Norman Jewison's Fiddler on the Roof and Peter Bogdanovich's The Last Picture Show in receiving eight nominations.
 April 12 – The X-rated animated movie Fritz the Cat is released.
 April 16 – Vietnam War – Nguyen Hue Offensive: Prompted by the North Vietnamese offensive, the United States resumes bombing of Hanoi and Haiphong.
 April 17 – The first Boston Marathon in which women are officially allowed to compete.
 April 29 – The fourth anniversary of the Broadway musical Hair is celebrated with a free concert at a Central Park bandshell, followed by dinner at the Four Seasons. There, 13 Black Panther protesters and the show's co-author, Jim Rado, are arrested for disturbing the peace and for using marijuana. On this day Kings Island in Mason Ohio opened to the public.

May
 May 2 – A fire in the Sunshine Mine in northern Idaho kills 91.
 May 8 – U.S. President Richard Nixon orders the mining of Haiphong Harbor in Vietnam.
 May 11 – The Boston Bruins defeat the New York Rangers four games to two to win the Stanley Cup.
 May 15 
 Okinawa is returned to Japan after 27 years of United States occupation.
 Governor George C. Wallace of Alabama is shot and paralyzed by Arthur Bremer at a political rally in Laurel, Maryland, United States.
 May 16 – The first financial derivatives exchange, the International Monetary Market (IMM), opens on the Chicago Mercantile Exchange.
 May 24 – A Red Army Faction bomb explodes in the Campbell Barracks of the U.S. Army Supreme European Command in Heidelberg, West Germany; 3 U.S. soldiers (Clyde Bonner, Ronald Woodard and Charles Peck) are killed.
 May 26
Richard Nixon and Leonid Brezhnev sign the SALT I treaty in Moscow, as well as the Anti-Ballistic Missile Treaty and other agreements.
The Watergate first break-in, the "Ameritas dinner", fails.
Wernher von Braun retires from NASA, frustrated by the agency's unwillingness to pursue a manned trans-orbital space program.
 May 27
 Mark Donohue wins the Indianapolis 500 in the Penske Racing McLaren-Offenhauser. This was the first win for Team Penske in the 500.
 A second Watergate break-in attempt fails.

June

 June 3 – Sally Priesand becomes the first female rabbi in the U.S.
 June 4 – Angela Davis is found not guilty of murder.
 June 9 – The Black Hills flood kills 238 in South Dakota.
 June 12 – The first Popeyes opens in Arabi, Louisiana.
 June 14–23 – Hurricane Agnes kills 117 on the U.S. east coast.
 June 15–18 – The first U.S. Libertarian Party National Convention is held in Denver, Colorado.
 June 17 
Watergate scandal: Five White House operatives are arrested for burglarizing the offices of the Democratic National Committee.
The United States returns Okinawa, occupied and governed since the Battle of Okinawa, to Japan.
Main Street Electrical Parade debuts at Disneyland in Anaheim, California. Parade was also cloned for other Disney Parks worldwide 
 June 23
Watergate scandal: U.S. President Richard Nixon and White House chief of staff H. R. Haldeman are taped talking about using the C.I.A. to obstruct the F.B.I.'s investigation into the Watergate break-ins.
President Nixon signs Title IX into law as part of the Education Amendments of 1972, prohibiting gender discrimination in any educational program receiving federal funds.
 June 26 – Nolan Bushnell and Ted Dabney co-found Atari, Inc.
 June 28 – U.S. President Richard Nixon announces that no new draftees will be sent to Vietnam.
 June 29 – Furman v. Georgia: The Supreme Court of the United States rules that the death penalty is unconstitutional, converting all death sentences to life imprisonment.

July
 July – U.S. actress Jane Fonda tours North Vietnam, during which she is photographed sitting on a North Vietnamese anti-aircraft gun.
 July 1 – Ms. magazine begins publication.
 July 1 – The Bureau of Alcohol, Tobacco and Firearms becomes independent from the IRS.
 July 4 – The first Rainbow Gathering is held in Colorado.
 July 8 – The U.S. sells grain to the Soviet Union for $750 million.
 July 10–14 – The Democratic National Convention meets in Miami Beach. Senator George McGovern, who backs the immediate and complete withdrawal of U.S. troops from South Vietnam, is nominated for President. He names fellow Senator Thomas Eagleton as his running mate.
 July 15 – The Pruitt–Igoe housing development is demolished in Saint Louis, Missouri.
 July 20 - The Armstrong Air & Space Museum is dedicated to honor Neil Armstrong, first man on the Moon.
 July 21 – Comedian George Carlin is arrested by Milwaukee, Wisconsin police for public obscenity, for reciting his "Seven Words You Can Never Say On Television" at Summerfest.
 July 23 – The United States launches Landsat 1, the first Earth-resources satellite.
 July 25 – U.S. health officials admit that African Americans were used as guinea pigs in the Tuskegee Study of Untreated Syphilis in the Negro Male.

August
 August 1 – U.S. Senator Thomas Eagleton, the Democratic vice-presidential nominee, withdraws from the race after revealing he suffered from depression and had been hospitalized three times for its treatment.
 August 4 
 Arthur Bremer is jailed for 63 years for shooting U.S. Presidential primary candidate George Wallace.
 A huge solar flare (one of the largest ever recorded) knocks out cable lines in U.S. It begins with the appearance of sunspots on August 2; an August 4 flare kicks off high levels of activity until August 10.
 August 10 – A brilliant, daytime meteor skips off the Earth's atmosphere due to an Apollo asteroid streaking over the western US into Canada.
 August 12 – The last U.S. ground troops are withdrawn from Vietnam.
 August 13–18 – The Special Olympics World Games take place in Los Angeles.
 August 20 – One hundred thousand people attended the legendary Wattstax Black music concert in the Los Angeles Memorial Coliseum in California.
 August 21 – The Republican National Convention in Miami Beach, Florida, renominates U.S. President Richard Nixon and Vice President Spiro Agnew for a second term.
 August 22 – John Wojtowicz, 27, and Sal Naturile, 18, hold several Chase Manhattan Bank employees hostage for 17 hours in Gravesend, Brooklyn, N.Y, an event later dramatized in the 1975 film Dog Day Afternoon.

September
 September 1 – Bobby Fischer defeats Boris Spassky in a chess match at Reykjavík, Iceland, becoming the first American chess champion (see Match of the Century).
 September 4 – The New Price is Right, a revival of the 1956-65 NBC and ABC game show of the same name premieres on CBS, along with Gambit and The Joker's Wild, overhauling the network's daytime schedule.
 September 12 – Maude, the first in a series of spin-offs from All in the Family, premieres on CBS. Bea Arthur starred as the title character.
 September 17 – The television series M*A*S*H begins its run on CBS.
 September 24 – An F-86 fighter aircraft leaving an air show at Sacramento Executive Airport fails to become airborne and crashes into a Farrell's Ice Cream Parlor, killing 12 children and 11 adults.

October
 October 8 – R. Sargent Shriver is chosen to replace Thomas Eagleton as the U.S. vice-presidential nominee of the Democratic Party.
 October 12 – USS Kitty Hawk riot: En route to the Gulf of Tonkin, a racial brawl involving more than 100 sailors breaks out aboard the United States Navy aircraft carrier USS Kitty Hawk; nearly 50 sailors are injured.
 October 15 – Baker v. Nelson is decided in the Minnesota Supreme Court, affirming that state law preventing same-sex marriage is constitutional.
 October 16
 October 16
 A plane carrying U.S. Congressman Hale Boggs of Louisiana and three other men vanishes in Alaska. The wreckage has never been found, despite a massive search at the time.
 Country singer Loretta Lynn makes history becoming the first female ever to win the Country Music Association's Entertainer of the Year Award. Her signature song, "Coal Miner's Daughter," is pivotal in earning her this award.
 October 22 - The Oakland Athletics defeat the Cincinnati Reds, 4 games to 3, to win their sixth World Series title in baseball.
 October 25 – The first female FBI agents are hired.
 October 26 – Following a visit to South Vietnam, U.S. National Security Advisor Henry Kissinger suggests that "peace is at hand."
 October 27 – Golden Gate National Recreation Area, Gateway National Recreation Area, & Glen Canyon National Recreation Area is established.
 October 30
U.S. President Richard Nixon approves legislation to increase Social Security spending by US$5.3 billion.
1972 Chicago commuter rail crash: The accidental tripping of a signal at 27th Street station on the Metra Electric system in Chicago causes an IC Electric express train to telescope another, killing 45 and injuring over 300.

November
 November – At a scientific meeting in Honolulu, Herbert Boyer and Stanley N. Cohen conceive the concept of recombinant DNA. They publish their results in November 1973 in PNAS. Separately in 1972, Paul Berg also recombines DNA in a test tube. Recombinant DNA technology has dramatically changed the field of biological sciences, especially biotechnology, and opened the door to genetically modified organisms.
 November 7 – U.S. presidential election, 1972: Republican incumbent Richard Nixon defeats Democratic Senator George McGovern in a landslide (the election had the lowest voter turnout since 1948, with only 55 percent of the electorate voting).
 November 8 – HBO begins operating as a pay television service. 
 November 11 – Vietnam War – Vietnamization: The United States Army turns over the massive Long Binh military base to South Vietnam.
 November 14 – The Dow Jones Industrial Average closes above 1,000 (1,003.16) for the first time.
 November 22 – Vietnam War: The United States loses its first B-52 Stratofortress of the war.
 November 29 – Atari, Inc. kicks off the first generation of video games with the release of their seminal arcade version of Pong, the first game to achieve commercial success.
 November 30 – Vietnam War: White House Press Secretary Ron Ziegler tells the press that there will be no more public announcements concerning United States troop withdrawals from Vietnam because troop levels are now down to 27,000.

December

 December 8
United Airlines Boeing 737 from Washington National to Chicago Midway crashes short of the runway, killing 43 of 61 onboard and two on the ground.
Over $10,000 cash is found in the purse of Watergate conspirator Howard Hunt's wife.
 December 14 – Apollo program: Eugene Cernan is the last person to walk on the Moon, after he and Harrison Schmitt complete the third and final Extra-vehicular activity (EVA) of Apollo 17. This is the last manned mission to the Moon of the 20th century.
 December 19 – Apollo program: Apollo 17 returns to Earth, concluding the program of lunar exploration.
 December 22 – A peace delegation that includes singer-activist Joan Baez and human rights attorney Telford Taylor visit Hanoi to deliver Christmas mail to American prisoners of war.
 December 23 – The Pittsburgh Steelers win their first ever postseason NFL game, defeating the Oakland Raiders 13–7, on a last-second play that becomes known as the Immaculate Reception.
 December 24 – Swedish Prime minister Olof Palme compares the American bombings of North Vietnam to Nazi massacres. The U.S. breaks diplomatic contact with Sweden.
 December 25 – The Christmas bombing of North Vietnam causes widespread criticism of the U.S. and President Richard Nixon.
 December 26 – Former President Harry S. Truman dies in Kansas City, Missouri.
 December 29 – Eastern Air Lines Flight 401 crashes into the Everglades in Florida, killing 101 of 176 on board.
 December 31 
 Baseball player Roberto Clemente dies in a plane crash off the coast of Puerto Rico while en route to deliver aid to Nicaraguan earthquake victims.
 The US ban on the pesticide DDT takes effect.

Undated
 The first women are admitted to Dartmouth College.
 Women are allowed to compete in the Boston Marathon for the first time.
The Environmental Protection Agency bans the use of the pesticide DDT.

Ongoing
 Cold War (1947–1991)
 Space Race (1957–1975)
 Vietnam War, U.S. involvement (1964–1973)
 Détente (c. 1969–1979)
 Watergate scandal (1972–1974)
 Capital punishment suspended by Furman v. Georgia (1972–1976)
 DOCUMERICA photography project (1972-1977)

Births

January

 January 1
 Sharon Blynn, actress and cancer activist
 Shane Carruth, director, producer, actor, composer and cinematographer
 Barron Miles, American-born Canadian football player and coach
 January 5 – Ariel McDonald, basketball player
 January 8 – Jacob Sager Weinstein, author and humorist
 January 9
 Mat Hoffman, BMX rider
 Jay Powell, baseball player
 Rawson Stovall, video game producer and author
 January 11 – Amanda Peet, actress
 January 12 – Zabryna Guevara, actress
 January 13
 Nicole Eggert, actress
 Kate Holbrook, historian and writer (d. 2022)
 January 16 – Joe Horn, football player
 January 18
 Jason Gray, Christian singer/songwriter
 Mike Lieberthal, baseball player
 January 19
 Drea de Matteo, actress
 Jon Fisher, businessman and author
 Tyrone Wheatley, American football player and college football coach
 January 20 – Nikki Haley, politician, 116th Governor of South Carolina, and 29th United States Ambassador to the United Nations
 January 22 – Gabriel Macht, actor
 January 24 – Beth Hart, singer
 January 28 – Amy Coney Barrett, attorney, jurist, judge, and justice for the U.S. Supreme Court
 January 29
 Matt Brandstein, writer
 Lisa Desjardins, journalist for PBS NewsHour
 January 30 – Jill McGill, golfer
 January 31 – Garret Graves, politician

February

 February 5 – Kristopher Carter, composer
 February 6 – Maurice Clemmons, convicted murderer (d. 2009) 
 February 7
 Essence Atkins, actress
 Robyn Lively, screen actress
 February 8 – Big Show, wrestler and actor
 February 9 – Crispin Freeman, voice actor
 February 11
 Craig Jones, musician 
 Kelly Slater, surfer
 February 14
 Drew Bledsoe, football player
 Angie Craig, politician
 Rob Thomas, singer/songwriter and frontman for Matchbox Twenty
 February 16
 Jerome Bettis, football player
 Sarah Clarke, actress
 February 17
 Billie Joe Armstrong, punk rock singer/songwriter, guitarist, and frontman for Green Day
 Taylor Hawkins, drummer for Foo Fighters (d. 2022)
 Ralphie May, comedian and actor (d. 2017)
 February 20 – Todd Graves, entrepreneur, restauranteur, and founder of Raising Cane's Chicken Fingers
 February 22 – Michael Chang, tennis player
 February 23 – Michael Ausiello, journalist, author, and actor
 February 26
 Keith Ferguson, voice actor
 Maz Jobrani, Iranian-born actor, comedian, and director
 February 29
 Dave Williams, singer and frontman for Drowning Pool (d. 2002)
 Saul Williams, singer, poet, and actor
 Pedro Zamora, Cuban-born AIDS activist and television personality (d. 1994)

March

 March 4 – Ivy Queen, Puerto Rican-born actress, singer/songwriter and record producer
 March 6
 Shaquille O'Neal, basketball player
 Jaret Reddick, singer/songwriter
 March 9
 Travis Lane Stork, emergency room physician and television personality
 Kerr Smith, actor
 Jean Louisa Kelly, actress
 March 10
 Matt Kenseth, race car driver
 Timbaland, record producer, songwriter, and rapper
 March 13
 Leigh-Allyn Baker, screen and voice actress
 Common, actor and rapper
 Trent Dilfer, American football player
 March 15
 Mark Hoppus, pop-punk singer/songwriter and bassist for blink-182
 Erik S. Kristensen, U.S. Navy SEAL (d. 2005)
 March 17
 Mia Hamm, soccer player
 Paige Hemmis, television personality
 Sean Price, rapper for Heltah Skeltah (d. 2015)
 March 18
 Dane Cook, comedian and actor
 Reince Priebus, politician
 March 21 – Chris Candido, wrestler (d. 2005)
 March 22
 Houston Alexander, mixed martial artist
 Shawn Bradley, basketball player
 Cory Lidle, baseball player (d. 2006)
 March 26 – Leslie Mann, actress
 March 27 – Charlie Haas, wrestler
 March 28 – Tammy Modlin, convicted murderer (d. 2016)
 March 31 – Evan Williams, Internet entrepreneur and co-founder of Twitter

April

 April 3
 LaToya Cantrell, politician, mayor of New Orleans, Louisiana (2018-present)
 Jennie Garth, actress
 April 6 – Jason Hervey, actor
 April 8
 Paul Gray, bassist and vocalist for Slipknot (d. 2010)
 Sung Kang, actor
 April 11
 Balls Mahoney, wrestler (d. 2016)
 Jason Varitek, baseball player
 April 14 – Dean Potter, free climber (d. 2015)
 April 15 – Lou Romano, animator and voice actor
 April 17 
 Tony Boselli, football player
 Jennifer Garner, actress
 April 20
 Carmen Electra, model, singer, and actress
 Stephen Marley, reggae musician
 April 22 – Willie Robertson, television personality, businessman, author, news contributor, and CEO of Duck Commander
 April 24
 Chad I Ginsburg, guitarist and vocalist for CKY
 Chipper Jones, baseball player
 April 27 – David Lascher, actor
 April 28 – Violent J, singer, rapper, wrestler, actor and one-half of the Insane Clown Posse

May

 May 1
 Julie Benz, actress
 Tracy Hines, racing driver and stunt driver
 May 2 – Dwayne Johnson, actor and wrestler
 May 4
 Mike Dirnt, rock musician and bassist for Green Day
 Chris Tomlin, Christian singer/songwriter and worship leader
 May 9
 Lisa Ann, pornographic actress
 Dana Perino, political commentator and White House Press Secretary (2005-2007)
 May 11 – Amanda Freitag, chef
 May 12 – Rhea Seehorn, actress
 May 16
 Derek Mears, actor and stuntman
 Khary Payton, voice actor
 May 20 – Busta Rhymes, actor and rapper
 May 21 – The Notorious B.I.G., rapper (d. 1997)
 May 22
 Max Brooks, horror author and screenwriter
 Alison Eastwood, fashion designer and actress
 May 25
 Jules Jordan, pornographic movie director, actor, and producer
 Octavia Spencer, actress and author
 May 28 – Christine Drazan, politician
 May 29 – Laverne Cox, actress and LGBTQ+ advocate
 May 31 – Dave Roberts, baseball player

June

 June 1 – Rick Gomez, actor
 June 2
 Wayne Brady, comedian
 Wentworth Miller, British-born actor and screenwriter
 June 3 – Matt Pike, singer/songwriter and guitarist for Sleep and frontman for High on Fire
 June 4 – Derian Hatcher, ice hockey player
 June 5 – Mike Bucci, wrestler
 June 7 – Ben Ray Luján, politician
 June 9 – Wes Scantlin, singer/songwriter and frontman for Puddle of Mudd
 June 10 – Steven Thomas Fischer, producer and director
 June 12 – Kyle Lake, pastor (died 2005)
 June 15 – Andy Pettitte, baseball player 
 June 16 – John Cho, South Korean-born actor
 June 17 – C. H. Greenblatt, animator
 June 18 – Kimberly Potter, cop convicted in the killing of Daunte Wright
 June 20 – Shane Hamman, Olympic weightlifter and powerlifter
 June 21 – Benjamin Byron Davis, actor, writer, director, and acting coach
 June 22 – David Rees, cartoonist and critic
 June 27 – Christian Kane, actor and singer/songwriter
 June 28 – Jon Heidenreich, wrestler
 June 29
 DJ Shadow, DJ and record producer
 Samantha Smith, peace activist (d. 1985)
 June 30 – Tyrone Davis, football player (died 2022)

July

 July 1 – Steve Little, actor and comedian
 July 7
 Lisa Leslie, basketball player
 Stoney Case, football player
 Kirsten Vangsness, actress and writer
 July 10
 Sofía Vergara, Colombian-born actress, television producer, comedian, presenter, and model
 John Viener, actor, voice actor, writer, and comedian
 July 11 – Michael Rosenbaum, actor, producer, singer, and comedian
 July 12 – Travis Best, basketball player
 July 13 – Sean Waltman, wrestler
 July 19 – Daedalus Howell, writer and filmmaker
 July 21 – Kimera Bartee, baseball player (d. 2021)
 July 22
 Seth Fisher, comic book artist (d. 2006)
 Keyshawn Johnson, football player
 July 23 – Marlon Wayans, actor, comedian, producer, and screenwriter
 July 27 – Maya Rudolph, actress
 July 28
 Elizabeth Berkley, actress
 Evan Farmer, television host, actor, and musician
 July 29 – Wil Wheaton, actor
 July 30 – GloZell, youtuber

August

 August 1 – D-Von Dudley, wrestler
 August 2
 Chris Bender, R&B singer (d. 1991)
 Muriel Bowser, politician, mayor of Washington D.C.
 August 7
 Heidi Cruz, businesswoman, managing director at Goldman Sachs, and wife of Ted Cruz
 Karen Disher, director
 Chip Roy, attorney and politician
 August 10 – Angie Harmon, actress
 August 11 – Jonathon Prandi, model and actor
 August 12 – Jonathan Coachman, WWE announcer
 August 13 – Kevin Plank, entrepreneur and founder of Under Armour
 August 14 – Ed O'Bannon, basketball player
 August 15 – Ben Affleck, actor, director, screenwriter, and producer
 August 16 – Emily Robison, country music performer and member of Dixie Chicks
 August 20 – Chaney Kley, actor (d. 2007)
 August 24 – Todd Young, politician 
 August 25 – Marvin Harrison, football player
 August 26 – Rufus Blaq, rap artist, singer/songwriter and record producer
 August 27 
 Chris Armas, soccer player and coach
 Jimmy Pop, rock performer and rapper
 August 30 – Cameron Diaz, actress and model

September

 September 3 – Bob Evans, wrestler and trainer
 September 4 – Robert Gregory Bowers, mass murderer
 September 6
 Dylan Bruno, actor and model
 Anika Noni Rose, actress
 September 7 – Slug, hip-hop musician and one-half of Atmosphere
 September 8 – Lisa Kennedy Montgomery, disc jockey and political satirist
 September 9 – Goran Višnjić, Croatian-born actor
 September 10 – Sara Groves, Christian musician
 September 15 
 Stephen Glass, disgraced journalist known for fabricating numerous stories 
 John Schwab, actor, voice actor, and musician
 September 16 – Mike Doyle, actor
 September 17 – Bobby Lee, actor
 September 19 – Cheryl B, poet and performance artist
 September 21
 Erin Fitzgerald, Canadian-born voice actress
 Jon Kitna, football player
 September 22
 Dana Vespoli, porn actress and director
 Matthew Rush, gay pornographic actor
 September 26
 Beto O'Rourke, politician
 Shawn Stockman, singer and musician for Boyz II Men
 September 27 
 Sylvia Crawley, basketball player
 Gwyneth Paltrow, actress, singer, and food writer
 September 28 – Dita Von Teese, burlesque dancer

October

 October 3 – Guy Oseary, Israeli-born businessman
 October 5
 Thomas Roberts, journalist
 Grant Hill, basketball player
 October 6 – J. J. Stokes, football player
 October 7 – Ben Younger, screenwriter and director
 October 8
 Terry Balsamo, guitarist for Cold and Evanescence
 Melanie McGuire, mariticide
 October 9 – Etan Patz, missing schoolboy
 October 11 – Tamara Gee, vocalist, songwriter, producer, dancer, and model
 October 12 – Karen Jarrett, wrestling manager and executive
 October 13 – Danny Lloyd, actor
 October 17 – Eminem, rapper
 October 20 – Brian Schatz, politician
 October 22 – D'Lo Brown, wrestler 
 October 24
 T. J. Cunningham, football player (d. 2019)
 Scott Peterson, convicted murderer
 October 27 – Brad Radke, baseball player
 October 28
 Terrell Davis, football player
 Brad Paisley, country music singer/songwriter
 October 29
 Tracee Ellis Ross, actress
 Gabrielle Union, actress
 October 31 – Pharoahe Monch, rapper

November

 November 1 – Jenny McCarthy, television performer
 November 4 – Julissa Gomez, gymnast (d. 1991)
 November 6 – Rebecca Romijn, actress
 November 7
 Christopher Daniel Barnes, actor and voice actor
 Jason London, actor
 November 9 – Eric Dane, actor
 November 10
 Isaac Bruce, football player
 Shawn Green, baseball player
 Greg LaRocca, baseball player
 November 14
 Matt Bloom, wrestler
 Troy Carter, music manager and co-founder of Q&A
 Josh Duhamel, actor
 Aaron Taylor, football player and sportscaster
 November 16 – Missi Pyle, actress and singer
 November 17 – Leonard Roberts, actor
 November 20 – Riddick Parker, football player (d. 2022)
 November 21 – Rain Phoenix, actress
 November 23 – Chris Adler, drummer for Lamb of God and Megadeth
 November 29 – Brian Baumgartner, actor

December

 December 1 – Stanton Barrett, stock car racing driver
 December 5
 Cliff Floyd, baseball player and sportscaster
 Mike Mahoney, baseball player
 Duane Ross, hurdler and coach
 December 7
 Tammy Lynn Sytch, wrestling manager and personality
 Jason Winer, actor, comedian, writer, director, and producer
 December 10
 Puff Johnson, singer (d. 2013)
 Brian Molko, musician (Placebo)
 December 11
 Dan Henk, artist and writer
 LaMont Smith, Olympic runner
 December 12 – Brandon Teena, murder victim (d. 1993)
 December 13 – Hilaree Nelson, ski mountaineer (d. 2022)
 December 15 – Rodney Harrison, football player
 December 18 – Jason Mantzoukas, actor, comedian, writer, and podcaster
 December 19
 Rosa Blasi, actress
 Alyssa Milano, actress
 Warren Sapp, football player and sportscaster
 December 21
 LaTroy Hawkins, baseball player
 Dustin Hermanson, baseball player
 December 25 – Josh Freese, musician and drummer
 December 28
 Jennifer McClellan, politician
 Kevin Stitt, politician, 28th Governor of Oklahoma
 Adam Vinatieri, football player
 December 30 – Kerry Collins, football player 
 December 31 – Joey McIntyre, actor and singer for New Kids on the Block

Full Date unknown
 Natasha D'Schommer, photographer
 Jason Goldberg, producer
 Erik LaRay Harvey, actor

Deaths

 January 7 
 John Berryman, poet and scholar (born 1914)
 Emma P. Carr, spectroscopist (born 1880)
 January 8 – Wesley Ruggles, film director (born 1889)
 January 9 – Ted Shawn, dancer (born 1891)
 January 16 – Ross Bagdasarian, Sr., actor, pianist, singer, songwriter and record producer, creator of Alvin and the Chipmunks (born 1919)
 January 17 – Betty Smith, novelist (born 1896)
 January 24 – Jerome Cowan, actor (born 1897)
 January 27 – Mahalia Jackson, gospel singer (born 1911)
 February 2 – Jessie Royce Landis, actress (born 1896) 
 February 3 – John Litel, screen actor (born 1892)
 February 4 – Orlando Ward, general (born 1891)
 February 5 – Marianne Moore, poet (born 1887)
 February 7
 Walter Lang, film director (born 1896)
 Bob Woodward, screen actor (born 1909)
 February 19 – Lee Morgan, jazz trumpeter (born 1938)
 February 20 – Walter Winchell, journalist (born 1897)
 February 22
 Dan Katchongva, Native American traditional leader (born 1860)
 Tedd Pierce, animator (born 1906)
 February 27 – Pat Brady, screen actor (born 1914)
 March 9 – Basil O'Connor, lawyer and chairman of the International Red Cross (born 1892)
 March 11
 Fredric Brown, science fiction and mystery writer (born 1906)
 Zack Wheat, baseball player (Brooklyn Dodgers) (born 1888)
 March 13 – Len Ford, American football player (Cleveland Browns) (born 1926)
 March 16 – Pie Traynor, baseball player (Pittsburgh Pirates) (born 1898)
 March 20 – Marilyn Maxwell, actress and entertainer (born 1921)
 March 27 – Lorenzo Wright, track and field athlete (born 1926)
 April 2 – Gil Hodges, baseball player and manager (born 1924)
 April 3 – Ferde Grofé, composer (born 1892)
 April 4 – Adam Clayton Powell Jr., politician (born 1908)
 May 2 – J. Edgar Hoover, first Director of the Federal Bureau of Investigation (born 1895)
 May 3 – Bruce Cabot, film actor (born 1904)
 May 4 – Edward Calvin Kendall, chemist, recipient of the Nobel Prize in Physiology or Medicine (born 1886)
 May 5
 Reverend Gary Davis, blues and gospel singer (b. 1896)
 Frank Tashlin, animator (born 1913)
 May 11 – Michael Blassie, U.S. Air Force lieutenant (born 1948; killed in action)
 May 13 – Dan Blocker, American actor (Bonanza) (born 1928)
 May 18 – Sidney Franklin, film director (b. 1893)
 May 26 – Edna Goodrich, actress (born 1883)
 May 31 – Walter Jackson Freeman II, neurologist (born 1895)
 June 8 – Mary van Kleeck, labor activist (born 1883)
 June 13 – Felix Stump, admiral (b. 1894)
 June 20 – Howard Deering Johnson, businessman, founder of Howard Johnson's (born 1897)
 July 27 – Allen J. Ellender, U.S. Senator from Louisiana; President pro tempore during the 92nd Congress (born 1890)
 August 7
 Joi Lansing, actress (born 1928)
 Tom Neal, actor (born 1914)
 August 11 – Max Theiler, virologist, recipient of the Nobel Prize in Physiology or Medicine (born 1899 in South Africa)
 August 20 – Harold Rainsford Stark, admiral (born 1880)
 September 8 – Warren Kealoha, Olympic swimmer (born 1903)
 September 14 – Lane Chandler, actor (born 1899)
 September 25 – Max Fleischer, animator (born 1883 in Poland)
 September 29 – Edward Sloman, silent film director, actor, screenwriter and radio broadcaster (born  1886 in the United Kingdom)
 October 8 – Prescott Bush, banker and politician (born 1895)
 October 16 – Hale Boggs, U.S. Representative from Louisiana's 2nd congressional district and Majority Leader during the 92nd Congress (born 1914)
 October 18 – Edward Cook, Olympic athlete (born 1888)
 October 24 – Jackie Robinson, first African-American in Major League Baseball (born 1919)
 October 29 – Victor Milner, cinematographer (born 1893)
 November 1 – Ezra Pound, poet (born 1885)
 November 11 – Berry Oakley, musician (born 1948)
 November 14 – Martin Dies Jr., lawyer and politician (born 1900)
 November 17 – Thomas C. Kinkaid, admiral (born 1888)
 November 18 – Danny Whitten, musician (born 1943)
 November 29 – Carl W. Stalling, composer (born 1891)
 December 3 
 Mike Brady, golfer (born 1887)
Bill Johnson, African American dixieland jazz double-bassist (born 1872)
 December 9 – Louella Parsons, gossip columnist and screenwriter (born 1881)
 December 12 – Thomas H. Robbins Jr., admiral (born 1900)
 December 15 – Edward Earle, Canadian-born American actor (born 1882 in Canada)
 December 18 – Neilia Hunter Biden, first wife of 46th US President Joe Biden (born 1942)
 December 23 – Norman Clyde, mountaineer, nature photographer and naturalist (born 1885)
 December 26 – Harry S. Truman, 33rd President of the United States from 1945 to 1953, 34th Vice President of the United States from January to April 1945 (born 1884)
 December 31 – Roberto Clemente, baseball player (Pittsburgh Pirates) (born 1934)

See also 
 List of American films of 1972
 Timeline of United States history (1970–1989)

References

External links
 
 

 
1970s in the United States
United States
United States
Years of the 20th century in the United States